The 1990 San Francisco State Gators football team represented San Francisco State University as a member of the Northern California Athletic Conference (NCAC) during the 1990 NCAA Division II football season. Led by Dennis Creehan in his first and only season as head coach, San Francisco State compiled an overall record of 4–7 with a mark of 1–4 in conference play, placing in a three-way tie for fourth place in the NCAC. For the season the team was outscored by its opponents 253 to 237. The Gators played home games at Cox Stadium in San Francisco.

Schedule

Team players in the NFL
The following San Francisco State players were selected in the 1991 NFL Draft.

References

San Francisco State
San Francisco State Gators football seasons
San Francisco State Gators football